Technically recoverable tight oil resources according to the EIA

References

Sources
 http://www.dawn.com/news/1220955

Tight oil